is a Japanese professional baseball catcher for the Tohoku Rakuten Golden Eagles in Japan's Nippon Professional Baseball.

External links

NPB.com

1989 births
Japanese baseball players
Living people
Nippon Professional Baseball catchers
Baseball people from Gunma Prefecture
Tohoku Rakuten Golden Eagles players